Abelardo is a masculine given name. It is an Italian form of the name Abelard. Sometimes used as a variant of Abel.

As a given name 
 Abelardo Abrego (1980-Present), Mexican/American, U.S. Naval Combat Veteran, Texas Law Enforcement Officer, Texas A & M Master of Science in Criminal Justice, U.S. Govt Advisor 
 Abelardo Aguilar, Filipino doctor and researcher
 Abelardo Aguilú Jr. (c. 1870–c. 1940), Puerto Rican politician
Abelardo Albisi (1872–1938), Italian musician and composer
Abelardo Alvarado Alcántara (1933–2021) Mexican Catholic prelate
Abelardo Díaz Alfaro (1916–1999), Puerto Rican author
Abelardo Ávila (1907–1967), Mexican engraver
Abelardo Barroso (1905–1972), Cuban singer
Abelardo Castro (born 1892, death date unknown), Chilean fencer 
Abelardo Castillo (1935–2017), Argentine author
Abelardo Delgado (1931–2004), American writer, community organizer, and poet
Abelardo Estorino (1925–2013), Cuban stage director
Abelardo Fernández (born 1970), Spanish footballer and manager
Abelardo Gandía (born 1977), Spanish paralympic cyclist
Abelardo Lafuente García-Rojo (1871–1931), Spanish architect
 Abelardo González (1944–2021), Spanish footballer
 Abelardo Colomé Ibarra, Cuban politician
Abelardo Menéndez (1928–1995), Cuban fencer
Abelardo Montalvo (1876–1950), former President of Eduador
Abelardo Morell (born 1948), Cuban-American photographer
Abelardo Olivier (1877–1951), Italian fencer
 Abelardo Escobar Prieto, Mexican politician
 Abelardo Quinteros (born 1923), Chilean composer
Abelardo Raidi (1914–2002), Venezuelan sportswriter and radio broadcaster
Abelardo Villalpando Retamozo (1909–1997), Bolivian politician
Abelardo Rico (born 1889, death date unknown), Argentine sports shooter
Abelardo Ríos (born 1952), Colombian racing cyclist
 Abelardo L. Rodríguez, President of Mexico
Abelardo Gamarra Rondó (1852–1924), Peruvian writer, composer, and journalist
Abelardo Rondón (born 1964), Colombian racing cyclist
Abelardo Saavedra, American school district superintendent
Abelardo Sztrum (born 1974), Argentine sprint canoer
Abelardo Rodríguez Urdaneta (1870–1933), Dominican sculper, painter, and educator
Abelardo L. Valdez, American lawyer and politician
Abelardo Vicioso (1930–2004), Dominican politician, lawyer, and poet

As a surname 
 Nicanor Abelardo (1893-1934), Filipino composer
 Richard Abelardo, Filipino film director

As a place name 
 Abelardo Luz
 Abelardo Pardo Lezameta District
 Abelardo L. Rodríguez International Airport

Fictional characters 

Abelardo Montoya, character on Plaza Sésamo
 Abelardo the Dragon, earlier version of the above

References 

Spanish masculine given names